Sartang-e Badam Shirin (also Romanized as Sartang-e Bādām Shīrīn; also known as Sartang-e Fāleḩ) is a village in Doab Rural District, Bazoft District, Kuhrang County, Chaharmahal and Bakhtiari Province, Iran. At the 2006 census, its population was 39, in 6 families. The village is populated by Lurs.

References 

Populated places in Kuhrang County
Luri settlements in Chaharmahal and Bakhtiari Province